Diamond Cay is an island in the Bahamas. It is located in the south Berry Islands region of the Bahamas, and is within the South Berry Islands Marine Reserve.

References

Islands of the Bahamas